Tuamotuan, Paumotu or Paumotu (Tuamotuan:  or ) is a Polynesian language spoken by 4,000 people in the Tuamotu archipelago, with an additional 2,000 speakers in Tahiti. 

The Tuamotu people today refer to their land as Tuamotu, while referring to themselves and their language as Paʻumotu. Paʻumotu is one of six Polynesian languages spoken in French Polynesia, the other five languages being Tahitian, Marquesan, Mangarevan, Rapa, and Austral.

The Paʻumotu alphabet is based on the Latin script.

History and culture 
Little is known regarding the early history of the Tuamotus. It is believed that they were settled c. 700 AD by people from the Society Islands. Europeans first discovered the islands in 1521, when Ferdinand Magellan reached them while sailing across the Pacific Ocean. Subsequent explorers visited the islands over the centuries, including Thor Heyerdahl, the famous Norwegian ethnographer who sailed the Kon-Tiki expedition across the Pacific in 1947.

The effects of early European visits were marginal as they had no political effects. The language, however, was ultimately affected by the Tahitian language, which was itself affected by European expansion. The eventual arrival of European missionaries in the 19th century also led to loanwords, including the creation of new vocabulary terms for the Tuamotuans' new-found faith, and the translation of the Bible into Tuamotuan.

The original religion of the Tuamotus involved the worship of a higher being, Kiho-Tumu or Kiho. Religious chants have been preserved and translated that describe the attributes of Kiho and how he created the world.

In more recent times, the Tuamotus were the site of French nuclear testing on the atolls of Moruroa and Fangataufa.

Classification 
Paʻumotu is a member of the Polynesian group of Oceanic languages, itself a subgroup of the Austronesian family.

Some foreign influence is present.

Geographic spread 

Paʻumotu is spoken among the atolls of the Tuamotuan Archipelago, which amount to over 60 small islands. Many of the former inhabitants have moved to Tahiti, causing the language to dwindle.

In the 1970s, there were a number of Tuamotuans living in Laie, O'ahu, Hawai'i, as well as other locations on the island of O'ahu. Some were reported to live in California and Florida. There were also a number of people living in New Zealand who were reportedly Tuamotuans, although they came from Tahiti.

Dialects
Paʻumotu has seven dialects or linguistic areas: covering Parata, Vahitu, Maraga, Fagatau, Tapuhoe, Napuka and Mihiro. The native Tuamotuan people are somewhat nomadic, shifting from one atoll to another and thereby creating a wide variety of dialects.

Paʻumotu is very similar to Tahitian, and a considerable amount of Tahitianization has affected Paʻumotu. Primarily due to the political and economical dominance of Tahiti in the region, many Tuamotuans (especially those from the Western atolls) are bilingual, speaking both Paʻumotu and Tahitian. Many young Tuamotuans who live on atolls nearer to Tahiti speak only Tahitian and no Paʻumotu.

An example is the Paʻumotu use of a velar sound such as k or g, which in Tahitian-Tuamotuan (a blending of the languages) is rather a glottal stop. The same is true with words such as / and /.

These differences in dialect lead to a split between "Old Tuamotuan" and "New Tuamotuan". Many younger Tuamotuans do not recognize some words that their forebears used, such as the word  for 'rain'. Younger Tuamotuans use the word  for 'rain' in contemporary Tuamotuan.

Grammar 
No systematic grammar has been published on the Tuamotuan language. Current Tahitian-Tuamotuan orthographies are based upon the Tahitian Bible and the Tahitian translation of the Book of Mormon.

An available source for Tuamotuan-English comparatives is The cult of Kiho-Tumu, which contains Tuamotuan religious chants and their English translation.

Phonology 

The glottal stop is found in a large number of Tahitian loanwords. An epenthetic glottal stop may be found at the beginning of monophthong-initial words.

Short vowels contrast with long vowels and vowel length is thereby phonemic. A number of non-identical vowel pairs appear in Tuamotuan, and long vowels are interpreted as pairs of identical vowels and written by doubling the vowels in all cases. In non-stressed position, the distinction between long and short may be lost. The position of stress is predictable. Primary stress is on the penultimate vowel before a juncture, with long vowels counting double and semi-vocalized vowels not counting as vowels. One out of every two or three vowels is stressed.. that is, the minimum domain for assigning stress is two vowels, and the maximum is three. When a long vowel is stressed, the stress falls on the entire vowel, regardless of which mora is penultimate, unless the long vowel is word-final. No more than one unstressed vowel/mora can occur in a row, but, when the first of two vowels is long, there is no stresses mora between them. Morphemes of a single short vowel cannot be stressed.

Vocabulary 
Naturally, a lot of similarity between other Polynesian languages can be seen in the vocabulary of Paʻumotu.

Paʻumotu speakers utilize fast deliberate speech, slow deliberate speech, and normal speech patterns. They apply phrase stress, which can be phonemic or morphemic, and primary stress, which is not phonemic.

Endangerment status 
According to UNESCO, Paʻumotu is "definitely endangered" Indeed, since before the 1960s, many of the Tuamotu islanders have migrated to Tahiti for education or work opportunities; this rural flight has strongly contributed to the weakening of Paʻumotu, which is sometimes described as a "dying language".

Since the 1950s, the only language used in education in French Polynesia was French. No Tahitian or Tuamotuan is taught in schools.

References

Further reading

External links 
 Linguistic map of French Polynesia, showing the different dialects of Paʻumotu (from Charpentier & François’ Linguistic Atlas of French Polynesia).
 Index cards of plant and animal names in Tuamotuan archived with Kaipuleohone (PA1-020, PA1-021)

Languages of French Polynesia
Tahitic languages
Tuamotus
Definitely endangered languages